Edward Adelbert Grimes (September 8, 1905 – October 6, 1974) was a Major League Baseball third baseman who played with the St. Louis Browns in  and .

External links

1905 births
1974 deaths
Major League Baseball third basemen
St. Louis Browns players
Baseball players from Chicago